Gabriella Giammanco (born 13 June 1977) is an Italian politician and journalist.

Biography 
Born in Palermo, Giammanco graduated in Communication Sciences and worked as a journalist for several local televisions and for TG4.

Vice President of the Italy-USA Foundation since 2008.

In 2008 and 2013 she was elected at Chamber of Deputies with The People of Freedom.

In 2017 she was appointed press attaché of Forza Italia in Sicily.

In 2018 she was elected at Italian Senate, where she is a member of the Committee of European Union.

In 2019 she was a candidate at Elections to the European Parliament for the Forza Italia party.

External links 
Italian Chamber of Deputies - Gabriella Giammanco
Italian Senate - Gabriella Giammanco
Gabriella Giammanco on Biografieonline.it

1977 births
Living people
Journalists from Palermo
Forza Italia politicians
The People of Freedom politicians
Forza Italia (2013) politicians
Deputies of Legislature XVI of Italy
Deputies of Legislature XVII of Italy
Senators of Legislature XVIII of Italy
Politicians from Palermo
21st-century Italian women politicians
Forza Italia (2013) senators
20th-century Italian women
Women members of the Chamber of Deputies (Italy)
Women members of the Senate of the Republic (Italy)